Isaiah 19 is the nineteenth chapter of the Book of Isaiah in the Hebrew Bible or the Old Testament of the Christian Bible. This book contains the prophecies attributed to the prophet Isaiah, and is one of the Books of the Prophets. This chapter focuses on Egypt.

Text 
The original text was written in Hebrew. This chapter is divided into 25 verses.

Textual witnesses
Some early manuscripts containing the text of this chapter in Hebrew are of the Masoretic Text tradition, which includes the Codex Cairensis (895), the Petersburg Codex of the Prophets (916), Aleppo Codex (10th century), Codex Leningradensis (1008).

Fragments containing parts of this chapter were found among the Dead Sea Scrolls (3rd century BC or later):
 1QIsaa: complete
 1QIsab: extant: verses 1, 7‑17, 20‑25
 4QIsaa (4Q55): extant: verses 9‑14
 4QIsab (4Q56): complete

There is also a translation into Koine Greek known as the Septuagint, made in the last few centuries BC. Extant ancient manuscripts of the Septuagint version include Codex Vaticanus (B; B; 4th century), Codex Sinaiticus (S; BHK: S; 4th century), Codex Alexandrinus (A; A; 5th century) and Codex Marchalianus (Q; Q; 6th century).

Parashot
The parashah sections listed here are based on the Aleppo Codex. Isaiah 19 is a part of the Prophecies about the Nations (Isaiah 13–23). {P}: open parashah; {S}: closed parashah.
 {S} 19:1-17 {S} 19:18 {S} 19:19-22 {S} 19:23 {S} 19:24-25 {S}

Structure

Proclamation Against Egypt

Verse 1
The burden against Egypt.
Behold, the Lord rides on a swift cloud,
And will come into Egypt;
The idols of Egypt will totter at His presence,
And the heart of Egypt will melt in its midst.
 "Burden": "oracle,  prophecy"; the keyword in the superscriptions for a total of nine similar oracles; the others being: Isaiah 13:1; 15:1; 17:1; 21:1, 11, 13; 22:1; 23:1.
"Totter": "shake"

Verse 13
The princes of Zoan have become fools;
The princes of Noph are deceived;
They have also deluded Egypt,
Those who are the mainstay of its tribes.
"Princes": here refer to a group of expert counselors of the Egyptian Pharaoh; despite their renowned wisdom they are mock as incapable.
Noph (or Moph) was the Hebrew name for the ancient city of Memphis.

Verse 15
 Neither shall there be any work for Egypt, 
 which the head or tail, branch or rush, may do.
 "the head or tail": see . Isaiah 9:15 gives the following interpretation of the terms:
"The elder and honorable, he is the head;
 The prophet who teaches lies, he is the tail."

Verse 18
In that day five cities in the land of Egypt will speak the language of Canaan and swear by the Lord of hosts: one will be called the City of Destruction.

Some Hebrew manuscripts, the Arabic text, the Dead Sea Scrolls, Targum, and Vulgate refer to the Sun, while the Septuagint reads Asedek (literally Righteousness). The name "City of the Sun" is used in the Revised Standard Version and New International Version. John Wycliffe used the Greek name Heliopolis.

See also
Canaan
Egypt
Nile
Noph (ancient Memphis)
Pharaoh
Zoan
Related Bible parts: Isaiah 9, Revelation 4, Revelation 20

References

Sources

External links

Jewish
Isaiah 19 Hebrew with Parallel English

Christian
Isaiah 19 English Translation with Parallel Latin Vulgate

19